Big Wilson (born Malcolm John Wilson Jr.; October 3, 1924 – October 5, 1989) was an American radio personality. He worked as a disc jockey at WNBC AM in New York City from the early 1960s until 1974 and moved to Miami in 1975 where he worked for WIOD and WCIX-TV.

Prior to moving to NYC, Wilson and his wife Jody lived in a riverfront home in Rocky River, Ohio.  He commuted to KYW (AM) Radio Cleveland where he was the leading radio personality for some years, interviewing Tim Conway and other well-known persons at their homes.

Wilson was one of the last two hosts of the NBC network radio program Monitor.

Big Wilson also served as the announcer for the weekly television program, Jack Horkheimer: Star Hustler.  During the program's opening sequence, Wilson's voice was the one which was heard reading the following poem:

After Big Wilson's death in 1989, Star Hustler continued to use Wilson's pre-recorded voice in the television program's introduction as a "living memorial" to the man. This ended in 1997 when the show was renamed Jack Horkheimer: Star Gazer.

Wilson, who was 6 foot 6 tall, and weighed more than 300 pounds, died from a heart attack, two days after his 65th birthday at a  hotel in Selma, North Carolina. He was sometimes referred to in advertisements as "Mrs. Wilson's little boy "Big".

References

External links
The New York Times obituary, October 7, 1989
Sun Sentinel obituary, October 7, 1989
Big Wilson's last show on WNBC, March 15, 1974

American radio personalities
1924 births
1989 deaths
Ithaca College alumni
People from Miami
People from Schenectady County, New York